Justin Ho Chun Ting (born 18 December 1998) is a Hong Kong professional footballer who plays as a midfielder for Hong Kong Premier League club Southern, on loan from Kitchee.

Club career
On 20 August 2018, Ho was loaned to Hoi King for the year.

On 16 September 2019, Tai Po acquired Ho on loan from Kitchee. 

On 11 October 2020, Ho made his debut for Kitchee, coming on as a 65th minute substitute against Happy Valley.

On 21 July 2022, Ho joined Southern on loan.

Honours

Club
Kitchee
 Hong Kong Premier League: 2019–20

International
Hong Kong
 Guangdong-Hong Kong Cup: 2019

References

External links

Ho Chun Ting at HKFA

1998 births
Living people
Hong Kong footballers
Association football midfielders
Kitchee SC players
Hoi King SA players
Tai Po FC players
Southern District FC players
Hong Kong Premier League players
Alumni of the University of Hong Kong